Fourteen athletes (thirteen men and one woman) from Chinese Taipei competed at the 1996 Summer Paralympics in Atlanta, United States.

Medallists

See also
Chinese Taipei at the Paralympics
Chinese Taipei at the 1996 Summer Olympics

References 

Nations at the 1996 Summer Paralympics
1996